Molinology (from Latin: molīna, mill; and Greek λόγος, study) is the study of mills and other similar devices which use energy for mechanical purposes such as grinding, fulling or sawing.

Mill technology
The term "Molinology" was coined in 1965 by the Portuguese industrial historian João Miguel dos Santos Simões. Mills make use of moving water or wind, or the strength of animal or human muscle to power machines for purposes such as hammering, grinding, pumping, sawing, pressing or fulling. 

Cultural and scientific interest in molinology is maintained by The International Molinological Society (TIMS), a non-profit organisation which brings together around five hundred members worldwide. It was founded in 1973 after earlier international symposia in 1965 and 1969. The Society aims to retain the knowledge of those traditional engines which have been rendered obsolete by modern technical and economic trends.

See also
 Watermill
 Tide mill
 Windmill
 Horse mill
 Ship mill
 Treadmill
 Treadwheel

Further reading

External links
Official website of The International Molinological Society
The Society for the Preservation of Old Mills (SPOOM)
The Mills Archive

References

History of technology